Charles-Antoine Campion, italianized as Carlo Antonio Campioni (16 November 172012 April 1788) was a French-Italian composer who was born in Lorraine, France. He was a prolific composer and represented a link between Baroque compositional methods and those of the Classical style.

Life

Early years and employment in Livorno
Campion was born in Lunéville (Meurthe-et-Moselle) in Lorraine to Jacques and Charlotte Bruget. Not much is known about his early musical education in Lorraine, but he may have been a student of Henri Desmarets. Given that his father was serving in the Lorraine court, his family was transferred to Florence, Italy at the same time as the rise to the throne of the Tuscan Granduca (Grand Duke) Francis of Lorraine in 1737. During this period of time, he presumably came into contact with Giuseppe Tartini, who was Campion's teacher. From 1752 to 1762, Campion was Chapel Master of the Cathedral in Livorno. He was fortunate to be friends with some aristocrats, and succeeded in having his opera (Venere placata, libretto by Marco Coltellini) performed for the celebration in Livorno (at the Avvalorati Academy) of the royal wedding of Joseph II and Princess Isabella of Parma in 1760. On 14 February 1763, the Grand Duke, with no regard to the normal selection procedures, nominated Campion Master of the Court Chapel, which combined that of the Cathedral and the Baptistry. It is possible that father Giovanni Battista Martini advised the Grand Duke to nominate Campion; it is known that Campion had been in contact with Martini previously (letters between the two men, who shared a passion for old music, are conserved at the International Museum and Music Library in Bologna).

Employment in Florence and international recognition
The employment of Campion followed the idea and desire to rebuild the court's musical activities in Florence, which was intended to be reestablished by the Lorraines after the decline during the Reggenza period: an intention that became intensified with the new Grand Duke Peter Leopold. During his employment in Florence, Campion gained the respect of Italian and European cultural society for his taste and his collection of antique music. Charles Burney mentions him as a great collectionist in his The Present State of Music in France and Italy, affirming that his collection was second only to that of Martini. In the 1760s, he traveled abroad in order to promote the publication of his music. He printed his music in Amsterdam and Paris under his own supervision, and Walsh published his works in London. The Walsh editions were diffused worldwide and were highly appreciated by Thomas Jefferson, who became a great collectionist of Campion's compositions for violin, of which he even kept a thematic catalogue. In 1766 he married Margherita Perloz Brunet, a harpsichord expert and painter, to whom he dedicated some of his keyboard compositions. There is some information regarding his meeting with Wolfgang Amadeus Mozart, who at the time was only fourteen, in Florence in 1770.

Final years and the querelle with Ligniville
In the 1770s, Campion was the protagonist of a harsh querelle with the Marquise Eugenio di Ligniville who was also from Lorraine and participated in the regeneration of the Florentine musical activities and supported the nomination of Campion to Master of the Unified Courts. Ligniville, himself, also gained from this nomination and received the appointment of Superintendent of the Music of the Real Chamber and Chapel. The nature of their contracts very clearly established the fact that Ligniville's concern was to ensure more complex performances, while Campion's task was to guarantee ordinary routine musical activities and administrative tasks. However, in 1772, perhaps driven by the desire for attention or by a competitive tendency unique to himself, Ligniville told the Grand Duke to not be satisfied by his superior musical status and accused Campion of not being able to manage the Capella, both economically and musically. This might have been an attempt to take Campion's job. The accusations were not supported by many in the Duke's court: Campion was well-liked by the Grand Duke himself and his officials. He succeeded in personally reacting to the attack, demonstrating his ability by writing the Trattato teorico e pratico dell'accompagnamento del cimbalo con l'arte di trasportare in tutti i toni e sopra tutti gli strumenti (a treaty of composition) dedicated to Peter Leopold (the autograph is found at the Conservatory in Florence). During the debate which lasted four years, Father Martini became indirectly involved, and although he was personally closer to Ligniville, Father Martini confirmed Campion's talent. As a result of his excessive accusations, in 1776 Ligniville was stripped of his responsibilities and fired, while Campion remained in his position, and received many honors until his death in 1788.

Works and style
Campion was a prolific composer and represents a trait d'union between Baroque compositional methods and those of the Classical style. He composed many instrumental pieces for harpsichord and strings, which were mentioned previously as being extremely successful abroad for demonstrating an excessive chromatic style, surely influenced by his teacher Tartini. He worked very often with sacred music, in which on the contrary demonstrates a very rigid approach to counterpoint. Many of his sacred compositions originate from celebrations and the court: for example, the Requiem for the death of Francis I of Lorrain (1766, the autograph is in Berlin, see Source section); the Te Deum, written for the birth of the heir to the throne Francis II (1768), which required almost 200 performers; and the Requiem for the Florentine celebration of the death of Maria Theresa (1781), today in Vienna (see Sources). Oddly, there are no profane celebratory compositions by Campion if not the cited Venere placata for the marriage of Josef II, and the incomplete Etruria fortunata, written for Peter Leopold, which was probably unfinished because of Campion's death (the autograph is conserved in Fiesole, see Sources). It is also important to mention the non-celebratory profane cantatas T'amo bell'idol mio, for voice and instruments (conserved at the Conservatory of Florence), and the epithalamic cantata written for the Pichi family, today in Ancona.

Sources

Autographs
Campion's autographs are found in the following places: 
Florence: the Conservatory Luigi Cherubini conserves the cited Trattato teorico e pratico dell'accompagnamento del cimbalo con l'arte di trasportare in tutti i toni e sopra tutti gli strumenti, dedicated to Peter Leopold (it remains unedited), and has at least 5 autographs of sacred music in addition to numerous contemporary manuscripts: all of the documents mostlty digitalized on Italian database Internet Culturale.
Ancona: «Luciano Benincasa» library conserved a probable autograph of the epithalamic cantata for the Pichi family.
Fiesole: in the library of the local music school (in the «Stefanelli» collection) was found the incomplete autograph of the cited Etruria fortunata, which is conserved in an elegant binding from the late 1700s.
Vienna: Österreichische Nationalbibliothek has the autograph of the cited Requiem for Maria Theresa (1781).
Paris: in the Bibliothèque Prunières a Concerto per oboe attributed to him is found.
Münster: the Santini-Bibliothek had a Mottetto a 4 voci e strumenti dated 1766.
Berlin: Musikabteilung of Preußischer Kulturbesitz into Staatsbibliothek zu Berlin conserved the cited Requiem for Francis I from 1766.

Manuscripts
Manuscripts of his compositions are spread around the world. The greatest number are found in Italy, in the cited libraries in Florence, Ancona, and the following locations.
Genoa (Paganini Conservatory),
Rome (in the Lateran archive, in the «Doria Pamphill» Archive and in Giancarlo Bostirolla's private library), 
Naples (San Pietro a Majella Conservatory),
Montecatini Terme (Venturi Collection),
Bologna (International Museum and Music Library),
Pistoia (Rospigliosi Collection in the Archive of the Chapter),
Venice (Fondation of Ugo and Olga Levi, «Marciana» National Library, Torrefranca Collection of the Benedetto Marcello Conservatory),
Bergamo («Angelo Mai» Civil Library),
Stresa (Private Archive «Borromeo» on Isola Bella),
Trento (State Archive),
Pavia di Udine («Ricardi» Private Library).
Copies can be found abroad in Stockholm (Musik- och teaterbiblioteket), Berkeley (Jean Gray Hargrove Music Library) and Louisville (Ricasoli Collection University of Kentucky: the manuscripts found in this collection are digitalized in IMSLP).

References

Further reading
 Arnaldo Bonaventura, Musicisti livornesi, in «Rivista di Livorno» (gennaio 1927), Livorno, Belforte, 1930, pp. 5–9.
 Renzo Bragantini, Campioni, Carlo Antonio, in Dizionario biografico degli italiani, vol. 17, Roma, Istituto dell'Enciclopedia Italiana, 1974, available on-line on Italian site Treccani.it.
 Charles Burney, The Present State of Music in France and Italy, London, Becket & Co., 1771.
 Charles-Antoine Campion, L'Etruria fortunata, facsimile of autographed full score edited by Stefania Gitto, Kuno Trientbacher & Hans Ernst Weidinger, Wien, Hollitzer, 2013. The book contains the following essays: 
 Gabriele Giacomelli, Charles-Antoine Campion: breve profilo biografico (pp. 23–25), it present also a further bibliography;
 Ottaviano Tenerani, La cantata celebrativa del settecento (pp. 26–28);
 Stefania Gitto, Una cantata inedita di Charles-Antoine Campion (pp. 29–30);
 Stefania Gitto, Hans Ernst Weidinger, Note al testo della cantata e al suo presupposto autore (pp. 31–32).
 Nikolaus Delius, I duetti per flauto di Nardini e la «scuola flautistica» a Firenze, in Federico Marri (ed.), Pietro Nardini violinista e compositore. Atti del Convegno, Livorno, 12 febbraio 1994, numero monografico di «Quaderni della Labronica», 64 (luglio 1996), Livorno, Debatte, 1996, pp. 35–51. 
 Mario Fabbri, Giovanni Battista Pescetti e un concorso per maestro di cappella a Firenze, in «Rivista Italiana di Musicologia», I (1966), Firenze, Olschki, 1966, pp. 120–126.
 Mario Fabbri, Enzo Settesoldi, Precisazioni biografiche sul musicista pseudolivornese Carlo Antonio Campioni (1720–1788), in «Rivista Italiana di Musicologia», III (1968), Firenze, Olschki, 1968, pp. 180–188.
 Constantin Floros, Carlo Antonio Campioni als Instrumentalkomponist, PhD dissertation of Vienna University, 1955.
 Constantin Floros, Musicisti livornesi: Carlo Antonio Campioni, in «Rivista di Livorno», V (1955), Livorno, SET, 1955, pp. 134–150.
 Constantin Floros, L'opera strumentale di Carlo Antonio Campioni, in «Rivista di Livorno», IX (1959), Livorno, SET, 1959, pp. 27–39.
 Constantin Floros, Campioni, Campion, Campione, Carlo Antonio, Charles Antoine, in Die Musik in Geschichte und Gegenwart. Allegemeine Enzyklopädie der Musik begründet von Friedrich Blume, edited by Ludwig Finscher, serie I: Personenteil, vol. 4: Cam-Cou, Kassel-Basel-London-New York-Praha, Bärenreiter/Stuttgart-Weimar, Metzler, 2000, pp. 47–50. It has further bibliography.
 Hans Freiberger, Anton Raaf (1714–1797). Sein Leben und Wirken als Beitrag zur Musikgeschichte des 18. Jahrhunderts, PhD dissertation of Bonn University, 1929, pp. 23, 73.
 Riccardo Gandolfi, La Cappella musicale della corte di Toscana (1539–1859), in «Rivista musicale italiana», XVI/3 (1909), Torino, Bocca, 1909, p. 520. Excerpts in Italian ara available on this link.
 Gabriele Giacomelli, Monsieur Campion e padre Martini: un "armonico segreto" fra lettere e ritratti, in «Recercare», XIV (2002), Lucca, LIM, 2002, pp. 159–189.
 Gabriele Giacomelli, Cherubini e la cappella musicale di San Giovanni, in Sergio Miceli (ed.), Cherubini al "Cherubini" nel 250° della nascita. Atti del convegno internazionale, Firenze, Olschki, 2011, pp. 213–229.
 Stefania Gitto, Le musiche di Palazzo Pitti al tempo dei granduchi Asburgo-Lorena. Storia della collezione musicale granducale, in «Annali di storia di Firenze», VI (2011), Firenze, Firenze University Press, 2011, pp. 121–154, available on-line.
 Ronald R. Kidd, The Sonata for Keyboard and Violin Accompaniment in England (1750–1790), PhD dissertation of Yale University, 1967.
 Ronald R. Kidd, voce Campioni [Campione], Carlo Antonio [Campion, Charles Antoine], in The New Grove of Music and Musicians. Second Edition, edited by Stanley Sadie, executive editor John Tyrrell, vol. 4: Borowski to Canobbio, London, Macmillan, 2001–2002, pp. 892–893.
 Warren Kirkendale, Fuge und Fugato in der Kammermusik des Rokoko und der Klassik, Tutzing (Baviera), Schneider, 1966.
 William S. Newman, The Sonata in the Classic Era, Chapel Hill (NC), University of North Carolina Press, 1963; 3rd edition: New York-London, Norton, 1983.
 Duccio Pieri, Il marchese Eugenio de Ligniville. Sovrintendente alla musica della Real Camera e Cappella, in «Philomusica. Rivista del dipartimento di filologia musicale», V/1 (2006), Pavia, Pavia University Press, 2006, available on-line in Italian.
 Duccio Pieri, I musicisti di corte. La Real Camera e Cappella, in Paola Gibbin, Lucia Chimirri, Mariella Migliorini Mazzini (ed.), Mozart a Firenze: ...qui si dovrebbe vivere e morire. Mostra bibliografica e catalogo, Firenze, Vallecchi, 2006, pp. 37–45.
 Franco Piperno, Campion, Charles-Antoine (Carlo Antonio Campioni), in Dizionario enciclopedico universale della musica e dei musicisti, edited by Alberto Basso, serie II: Le biografie, vol. 2: BUS-FOX, Torino, UTET, 1985, p. 86.
 John A. Rice, Music in the Duomo during the Reign of Pietro Leopoldo I (1765–1790), in Piero Gargiulo, Gabriele Giacomelli, Carolyn Gianturco (ed.), Cantate Domino. Musica nei secoli per il duomo di Firenze. Atti del convegno internazionale di studi (Firenze, 23–25 maggio 1997), Firenze, Edifir, 2001, pp. 259–274. Revised and expanded version
 Fausto Torrefranca, Le origini italiane del romanticismo moderno. I primitivi della sonata moderna, Torino, Bocca, 1930, pp. 587–598.

External links
  
Trio sonata op.7 Score from Sibley Music Library Digital Scores Collection
Trio sonata op.5 Score from Sibley Music Library Digital Scores Collection
C. A. Campioni from Tesori Musicali Toscani
 Musical Documentation Center of Tuscany

1720 births
1788 deaths
18th-century Italian composers
Italian male composers
French composers
French male composers
18th-century composers
18th-century Italian male musicians
Pupils of Giuseppe Tartini